Petite France may refer to

 Petite France, Gapyeong, a French themed cultural village set in Korea
 Petite France, Strasbourg, a historic quarter of the French city of Strasbourg

See also:
 Petty France (disambiguation)